Slovakia is scheduled to compete at the 2017 World Aquatics Championships in Budapest, Hungary from 14 July to 30 July.

Open water swimming

Slovakia has entered three open water swimmers

Swimming

Slovak swimmers have achieved qualifying standards in the following events (up to a maximum of 2 swimmers in each event at the A-standard entry time, and 1 at the B-standard):

Men

Women

Mixed

Synchronized swimming

Slovakia's synchronized swimming team consisted of 11 athletes (11 female).

Women

 Legend: (R) = Reserve Athlete

References

Nations at the 2017 World Aquatics Championships
Slovakia at the World Aquatics Championships
2017 in Slovak sport